The St. Clairsville Historic District is located in downtown St. Clairsville, Ohio, United States. The historic district contains buildings built during the Victorian era. The Belmont County Courthouse, St. Clairsville Municipal Building, and the Clarendon Hotel are some of the most notable buildings in the district. The district was placed on the National Register of Historic Places on 1994-03-17.

References

National Register of Historic Places in Belmont County, Ohio
Historic districts on the National Register of Historic Places in Ohio